Wu Muye (born 23 December 1985) is a Chinese pianist.

Early life and education 
Wu Muye was born on 23 December 1985 in Beijing, and grew up in Hainan.  He started taking piano and violin lessons at the age of 4. At 5, he gave his first public performance, and he won his first contest, the Hong Kong Children's Piano Competition, at the age of 9. In 1996 he was admitted to the fifth grade of the National Conservatory of Music in Beijing. After graduating in 1999, he moved to Paris to study at the Conservatoire National Supérieur de Musique et de Danse, having Jacques Rouvier as his mentor. After completing the undergraduate program he continued studying at the Conservatoire, despite already having an international career, and graduated in 2009 with a PhD in music.

In 2009, he also became the first Chinese pianist to ever receive the Perfect Piano Performing Artist Medal by the French Ministry of Culture.

Career 
Wu Muye has won several awards and is laureate of many international piano competitions including 3rd Prize at the 2003 Ferruccio Busoni International Piano Competition in Bolzano, Italy,  the Grand-Prix at the 2004 Marguerite-Long-Jacques-Thibaud Competition in Paris, France, and the gold medal at the 2005 Piano Campus International Piano Competition in Pointoise, France.

He has performed at many prestigious events such as the Expo Shanghai 2010, the 60th Anniversary Gala of UNESCO,  at the 50th Anniversary Ceremony for the establishment of diplomatic relations between China and France and at the APEC state banquet hosted for the US president Barack Obama in 2014; at the Milan Expo 2015; at the Opening Ceremony of the 2016 G20 Summit;  at the World Health Organization Meeting dedictated to the 30rd World AIDS Day at the WHO headquarters and at the BRICS Leaders Meeting in 2017; and at the CCTV Spring Festival Gala in 2018.

He had two soloist world tours, the Wu Muye "Complete Works of Schubert impromptus" Piano Recital Tour from 2018 to 2019, and in December 2019 his Wu Muye "Complete Works of Chopin Waltzes" Piano Recital World Tour started.

In December 2018, he opened a piano studio, the Wu Muye Studio, in Hangzhou, that gives non-profit piano lessons to children and teenagers.

Filmography

Awards, titles and honors

References

Living people
1985 births
People from Hainan
Classical pianists
Chinese classical pianists
21st-century classical pianists
Male classical pianists
Prize-winners of the Ferruccio Busoni International Piano Competition
21st-century male musicians